The WNBA All-Rookie Team is an annual Women's National Basketball Association (WNBA) honor given since the 2005 WNBA season to the top rookies during the regular season. Voting is conducted by the WNBA head coaches, who are not allowed to vote for players on their own team. Each coach selects five players. A player is given a point for every vote they receive. The top vote getters comprise the team, regardless of the positions they play. Through the 2021 season, this differed from the WNBA's voting procedure for the All-WNBA and All-Defensive Teams, in which all first and second teams consisted of a center, two forwards, and two guards. In 2022, the WNBA changed the All-WNBA Teams to a positionless format, but continues to use position-based selections for the All-Defensive Team.

The All-Rookie Team is generally composed of a five-woman lineup, but in the case of a tie at the fifth position the roster is expanded.

Candace Parker of the Los Angeles Sparks was named to the All-Rookie Team and won the WNBA Most Valuable Player Award in the same season. This feat had never before been accomplished. In the NBA, only Wes Unseld and Wilt Chamberlain has held this distinction.

Winners

References

 

Awards established in 2005
All, Wnba Rookie
Rookie player awards